The Fall and Rise of Reginald Perrin is a British sitcom starring Leonard Rossiter in the title role. It is based on a series of novels written by David Nobbs and produced from 1976 to 1979. Nobbs adapted the screenplay for the first series from the novel. Some of its subplots were considered too dark or risqué for television and were toned down or omitted.

The story concerns a middle-aged middle manager, Reginald "Reggie" Perrin, who reveals himself in the first series to be aged 46, who is driven to bizarre behaviour by the pointlessness of his job at Sunshine Desserts. The sitcom proved to be a subversion of others of the era, which were often based on bland, middle-class suburban family life.

The first novel in the series, The Death of Reginald Perrin, was published in 1975. Later editions were retitled to match the title of the television series. The Return of Reginald Perrin (1977) and The Better World of Reginald Perrin (1978) were written by Nobbs to be adapted for the second and third television series; Rossiter did not want to take the series forward unless it continued to be grounded in novels.

The original three television series, all of the same name, were broadcast between 1976 and 1979; a fourth, The Legacy of Reginald Perrin, also written by Nobbs, followed in 1996. A new dramatisation of the original novels by Jon Canter, without the complications introduced in the TV series, was broadcast on BBC Radio Four in November 2020.

Episodes

Series One (8 September – 20 October 1976)
The first series was based on Nobbs' novel The Death of Reginald Perrin, retitled The Fall and Rise of Reginald Perrin to tie in with the television series; it retains the replacement title.

Reginald Iolanthe Perrin is suffering a midlife crisis and tries to escape his dreary life. He lives at 12 Coleridge Close, part of the 'Poets Estate' in a south London suburb called Climthorpe, a development differing from those around it only by having its streets named after famous poets. From references, it would have approximately coincided with Teddington (although in episode 1, he is seen entering Norbiton railway station). He commutes to Sunshine Desserts, where he works as a sales executive. Each morning he is 11 minutes late (this increased to 17 then 22 minutes with subsequent series), yet each morning he gives a different excuse. These become increasingly bizarre ("defective junction box, New Malden" being one of the more plausible ones), reflecting the decline of British Rail and his own mental health. He enters the office building under the Sunshine Desserts sign which, as the series progresses, loses more and more of its letters.

"Reggie", as he is known, daydreams in Walter Mitty style. Part of the narrative demonstrates what voices in his head are saying. Although he appears to love his wife, he fantasises about his secretary, Joan Greengross. As his behaviour becomes more erratic, Reggie is unable to dictate letters without uttering words like "breast". Far from being offended, Joan welcomes the attention, adjusting her posture to show off her figure.

The endless marketing campaigns for bizarre products, satirised in reports from the product research department, combine with Reggie's relations with his oppressive boss 'CJ' and his yes-man subordinates to drive him over the edge. Ceasing to care about the consequences, he dictates offensive and condescending replies to customers.

At home, things are no better. Despite his warm relationship with his wife Elizabeth, he suffers from impotence. As pressures at work build, relations with his dysfunctional relatives deteriorate. His brother-in-law Jimmy and son-in-law Tom are both presented as incompetent. Tom's political correctness emphasises his pomposity. After Reggie commits a few reckless acts, including getting out of his car in the lion enclosure at a safari park, he fakes suicide by leaving clothes and personal effects on a beach.

Before this he sends CJ an anonymous threat containing the words "blood will flow" and dumps loganberry essence into a stream while CJ is angling. CJ collapses and the incompetent company doctor, Doc Morrisey, pronounces him dead. CJ opens one eye and says, "You're fired!"

Assuming disguises, Reggie encounters more of the banal and pompous side of life. Only as a buck-toothed farm labourer does he find fulfilment working in a sewage works and looking after pigs. Missing his wife, he assumes the identity of Martin Wellbourne, returned from South America, and visits her. He realises he still loves her. Elizabeth, seeing through his disguise, is happy to have him back.

Series Two (21 September – 2 November 1977)
In the second series (novelised as The Return of Reginald Perrin), Reggie is tired of being Martin Wellbourne and wants to be Reggie again. He reveals his true identity to his family (though his wife and daughter already know). When CJ learns from Doc Morrisey that he is Reggie, he sacks them both. Elizabeth goes out to work at Sunshine Desserts and Reggie returns to the pig farm, but they are both sacked after Reggie's employer learns of his faked suicide and Elizabeth sends a rude letter telling the truth about Sunshine's products.

Reggie then opens a shop called Grot, where he sells useless products – like square hoops, round dice and Tom's wine (made from sprouts, nettles and the like) – hoping it will be an interesting failure. However, the products are snapped up as novelties and Grot becomes a huge success. Reggie relapses into alienation and tries to destroy Grot from within by hiring incompetents, but this backfires as they all display unsuspected talents. Reggie finally resolves to disappear again, this time accompanied by Elizabeth.

Series Three (29 November 1978 – 24 January 1979)
In the third series (novelised as The Better World of Reginald Perrin), after seeing two men arguing pointlessly in a queue at the bank, Reggie and his wife open a community called Perrins for the middle-aged, middle class, designed to help them become "better, happier people". The project is a success until a group of people who have fallen afoul of the "Perrins Peace Keeping Force" trash the place.

Reggie is then hired by CJ's brother FJ at Amalgamated Aerosols, working directly under CJ.  Reggie instantly returns to his eccentric ways and the final scene shows him contemplating another trip to the Dorset coast.

In the third series, the role of Reggie's son-in-law Tom is played by Leslie Schofield, replacing Tim Preece, who had played the role in the first two series. Preece returned to the role for The Legacy of Reginald Perrin (see below). Despite only being mentioned (rather than seen) in the previous series, Theresa Watson also became a regular cast member playing Pru, the wife of David Harris-Jones (Bruce Bould).

Christmas sketch (26 December 1982)
In 1982, as part of a BBC1 Christmas special called The Funny Side of Christmas, a short sketch featured the regular cast visiting Reggie's house on Christmas Day. Despite being annoyed at the continual interruption of his colleagues' arrival, he dispenses presents from beneath his own Christmas tree. In a final scene, Reggie's living room is shown empty, even of furniture. The sketch is unrelated to the regular series, which had finished three years earlier in 1979.

The Legacy of Reginald Perrin (22 September – 31 October 1996)
This follow-up series, made more than a decade after Leonard Rossiter's death, shows Reggie's legacy – a fortune left to friends and family, but with strange conditions. It failed with most viewers, as the loss of Leonard Rossiter removed some affection for the series. Despite a leading man in Geoffrey Palmer, it had no central character. Both book and series were titled The Legacy of Reginald Perrin.

In the series, Reggie's family and friends are told by lawyer Geraldine Hackstraw that each will inherit one million pounds, on the one condition that they do something totally absurd. The nature of their absurd task is left to the individuals, but it is to be judged by Ms Hackstraw. Most of them have fallen on hard times, having in the main been forced to retire or been made redundant due to their age.

After several pathetic solo attempts at being absurd (including both CJ and Doc asking out Geraldine), the potential legatees decide to pool forces, and, with Jimmy as leader, decide to mount a bloodless coup. They intend to reverse age roles, with such policies as pensions for the young. The policies are a success, but with the unexpected outcome of their losing the money in the bequest. As Geraldine points out, the idea has turned out not to be absurd after all (although Ms Hackstraw's final words to Jimmy as they parted mentioned that it was open for the group to come back to her with a more absurd plan to claim the bequest).

The series' characters and actors comprised all of the central characters of the earlier series, except Reginald Perrin and Tony Webster (Trevor Adams). It also included Patricia Hodge as Geraldine Hackstraw and Michael Fenton Stevens as Hank.

Cast
Reginald Iolanthe Perrin: Leonard Rossiter
Elizabeth Perrin, his wife: Pauline Yates
Mark Perrin, their son: David Warwick (series one only)
Linda Patterson, their daughter: Sally-Jane Spencer
Tom Patterson, her husband: Tim Preece (first two series and Legacy) and Leslie Schofield (third series) (catchphrase: "I'm not a —— person.")
Joan Greengross, his secretary: Sue Nicholls
CJ (Charles Jefferson), his boss: John Barron (who also played CJ's brother FJ).  CJ is much given to Dundrearyisms and pompous statements beginning,"I didn't get where I am today by ..." – except when Reggie becomes his boss, whereupon he says, "I didn't get where you are today by ..."; also, "Neither Mrs CJ nor I have ever..." and "We're not one of those dreadful firms that..."
Tony Webster, "Great!": Trevor Adams
David Harris-Jones, "Super!": Bruce Bould
Jimmy Anderson, Elizabeth's brother: Geoffrey Palmer (catchphrase: "Bit of a cock up on the —— front.")
Doc (Gerald) Morrissey, company doctor at Sunshine Desserts: John Horsley
Seamus Finnegan, "a poor tongue-tied labourer from the land of the bogs and the little people" with an unrecognised genius for management: Derry Power (series two and three only)
Kenny McBlane, Scottish chef at Perrin's: Joseph Brady (series three only)
Pru Harris-Jones, wife of David Harris-Jones: Theresa Watson (series three and Legacy only)

Production

At the end of the first series, Reggie fakes suicide by leaving his clothes on a beach in West Bay, Dorset and running into the sea. Coincidentally, MP John Stonehouse faked his own death in this manner shortly before the book was published, although neither was inspired by the other; the novel was written before Stonehouse's faked suicide in November 1974, but not published until 1975. The phrase "do a Reggie Perrin" did enter the vernacular, however, assisted by the Stonehouse affair.

The series introduced catchphrases that entered popular culture in the UK, including Perrin's reflexive apology for a late arrival at the office; his boss CJ's "I didn't get where I am today ..."; the fawning junior executives Tony Webster and David Harris-Jones with their alternating "great/super"; and Perrin's brother-in-law Major Jimmy Anderson, an army officer with no grasp of organisation or leadership, coming to eat because of a "bit of a cock-up on the catering front" (caused in the original novel by his wife's alcoholism).

The first series included the character of Mark Perrin, Reggie's son, played by David Warwick. However, David Nobbs felt he diverted the comedy from Reggie, so he was written out by going on tour with a theatre group in Africa.

Although mainly produced on video and shot on studio sets, the series also incorporated innovative surreal escapism through film inserts, notably during scenes in which, whenever his mother-in-law is mentioned, Reggie visualises a hippopotamus trotting along.

Writer David Nobbs went on to create the Channel 4 comedy series Fairly Secret Army, whose lead character, Harry, was inspired by, if not directly related to, the Perrin character of Jimmy, and also played by Geoffrey Palmer.

Filming
Exterior views of the Perrin residence – 12 Coleridge Close, in the fictional suburb Climthorpe – were shot at 6 Beaufort Close, Ealing, W5.  Reggie's walk to work was shot on the corner of Audley Road and The Ridings and on the corner of Ashbourne Close. All three roads are within about 100 yards of one another.

Many exterior scenes were filmed at sites in Cheltenham including Eldorado Road and the Beehive public house.

The Sunshine Desserts office building is at 32–36 Telford Way, Acton ( – now demolished).

Reggie's faked suicide, which formed part of the title sequence, occurred at West Bay, Dorset, with the East Cliff visible in the very opening shot.

The first episode begins with commuters making their way to Norbiton railway station in the Royal Borough of Kingston upon Thames. The morning trains' constant lateness in the earlier series is usually blamed on incidents at actual stations along the railway from Norbiton and Kingston to Waterloo.

DVD releases

Remakes
A short-lived U.S. version was produced and broadcast on ABC in 1983 as Reggie, with Richard Mulligan in the title role.

Martin Clunes starred in a BBC revival of the series, titled simply Reggie Perrin. The supporting cast members were Fay Ripley, Wendy Craig, Geoffrey Whitehead, Neil Stuke, and Lucy Liemann. The series was written by Simon Nye and original series creator David Nobbs. It ran for two series from April 2009 to November 2010.

References

External links

Official Reggie Perrin website

1970s British sitcoms
1976 British television series debuts
1979 British television series endings
1990s British sitcoms
1996 British television series debuts
1996 British television series endings
BBC television sitcoms
British surreal comedy television series
English-language television shows
Midlife crisis in television
Television series by Entertainment One
Television shows set in London